Marc Lee (born March 17, 1969) is a Swiss new media artist working in the fields of interactive installation art, internet art, performance art and video art.

Biography
Lee was born in 1969 in Knutwil, Lucerne, in Switzerland. He studied at the Basel University of Art and Design installation and at the Zurich University of the Arts new media art through 2003.

Lee creates network-oriented interactive projects since 1999. He is experimenting with information and communication technologies. His projects locate and critically discuss economic, political, cultural and creative issues.
His artworks reflect the visions and limits of our information society in an intelligent and artistic manner.

Marc Lee has exhibited in major art exhibitions including: ZKM Karlsruhe, New Museum New York, Transmediale Berlin, Ars Electronica Linz, Contemporary Art Biennale Sevilla, Media Art Biennale Seoul, Viper and Shift Festival Basel, Read_Me Festival Moskau, CeC Delhi, MoMA Shanghai, ICC Tokyo and National Museum of Modern and Contemporary Art Seoul.

Lee's work are in private and public collections including the Federal Art Collection Switzerland and the ZKM Karlsruhe and he has won many prices and honorary mentions at international festivals, including Transmediale Berlin and Ars Electronica Linz

Art projects
 10.000 Moving Cities – Same but Different explores how our planet is becoming increasingly homogeneous and how globalization creates more and more “places without a local identity” – as described in Marc Augé’s essay Non-place (1992). In 10.000 Moving Cities all cities have the identical buildings, but the information on the building facades are constantly different. They are searched in real time on social networks about the chosen location. This ongoing experimental research project is developed by Marc Lee in collaboration with Intelligent Sensor-Actuator-Systems Laboratory (ISAS) at the Karlsruhe Institute of Technology and the ZKM Center for Art and Media Karlsruhe. Four versions have been created so far: augmented reality (AR) version, virtual reality (VR) version, mobile app version, and a "real cubes" version. These versions are technologically very different but address the identical topic. A large-scale exhibition was at the premiere exhibition Connecting_Unfolding of the National Museum of Modern and Contemporary Art Seoul. 
 Unfiltered – TikTok and the Emerging Face of Culture is an immersive installation. It explores the influence of digital accessibility and questioning its impact on public consciousness, visual aesthetics and identity structures. With the increasing access to social media, digital hierarchies are being broken. Platforms like TikTok are the new city town hall, whose "influence" is no longer limited to the urban elite.
 Echolocation – Mapping the Free Flow of Information Around the World in Realtime deals with cultural diversity and at the same time with the powerful homogenization. It poses questions about the meaning of our culture which is becoming increasingly similar. In Echolocation, stories posted on social networks like YouTube, Flickr and Twitter can be searched in real time about self chosen location.
 Corona TV Bot is current version of Marc Lee’s TV bot, an ongoing project started in 2004, filters the latest Twitter and YouTube posts according to self-definable keywords or hashtags. In response to the coronavirus pandemic, the latest Twitter and YouTube posts about COVID-19 and Coronavirus are mediated in a wild continuous TV show feed and reflect the coronavirus pandemic 24/7 online. Since the Corona virus pandemic, 6-hour broadcasts are recorded every week. These resources can be compared in a chronological order to make cultural, economic and political factors, differences, development and change tangible.
 360° VR Mobile Art Apps are research projects for interactive art installations. Visitors can interact using smartphones or tablets and become performers. The mobile display is projected on one or more walls in the exhibition space. The sonic sound experiences are specially composed for the apps and respond to movements and navigation modes.
 Political Campaigns – Battle of Opinion on Social Media In political campaigns around the world, supporters of opposing parties have engaged in heated battles on social media. "Political Campaigns" filters the latest Twitter, Instagram, and YouTube posts, which include search terms of top candidates or parties, and weaves them into a wild TV news show (24/7). What counts today are likes and retweets, which travel across the screen fighting for victory and indicate their current online market value. A network-based TV show that confronts us with opinions that don't reflect just variants of our own.
 Pic-Me – Fly to the Locations Where Users Send Posts With Pic-Me you can virtually fly to the places from where users send posts to Instagram, thus offering another view on how the media handles posts on social networks. This work makes us think what happens to the huge amounts of data generated by humans and collected by institutions worldwide?
 Loogie.net generates television news programs on self-made topics at the push of a button. The first founded "interactive news television station" in 2003. This research project is a TV news channel, media satire and art installation at the same time.
 Breaking the News – Be a News-Jockey Information on self-made topics are transmitted in real time from the internet and audiovisualized on four large projections. The user becomes a live performer, a news jockey. About News-Jockey:

Exhibitions
 2022 – Swiss Media Art - Pax Art Awards, HEK (Haus der Elektronischen Künste), Basel, Switzerland
 2022 – Infrastrukturen, Galerie für Gegenwartskunst E-Werk, Freiburg, Germany
 2022 – Hacking Identity - Dancing Diversity, European Capitals of Culture, Möllerei Esch, Luxemburg
 2021 – Super Fusion Chengdu Biennale, Chengdu Museum of Contemporary Art and Tianfu Gallery, Chengdu, China
 2021 – Advance and retreat of globalization, Macao International Art Biennale, Art Macao Main Exhibition, Macao
 2020 – Unfiltered, SPACE10, New Delhi, India
 2020 – Stormy Weather, Kunstraum Niederoesterreich, Vienna, Austria
 2020 – Schafhof - European Center for Art Upper Bavaria sculpture garden, Freising, Germany
 2019 – International Symposium on Electronic Art (ISEA) juried exhibition, Asia Culture Center (ACC), Gwangju, South Korea
 2019 – FILE SAO PAULO 2019, Electronic Language international Festival SESI Gallery, São Paulo, Brazil
 2019 – Non-Places, Annka Kultys Gallery, London, England
 2017–2018 – Aestetic of Changes, MAK - 150 Years of the University of Applied Arts Vienna, Austria
 2017–2018 – Open Codes, ZKM, Karlsruhe, Germany
 2017 – VIRTUALITIES AND REALITIES, RIXC Art Science Festival, Center for New Media Culture, Riga, Latvia
 2017 – Bubbling Universes, FILE FESTIVAL, São Paulo, Brazil
 2017 – Non-Places, Galerie b, Stuttgart, Germany
 2017 – The Unframed World, HeK, Basel, Switzerland
 2016–2017 – New GamePlay, Nam June Paik Art Center, Seoul, Korea
 2016 – The Show Must Go On, Situations, Fotomuseum Winterthur, Switzerland
 2015–2016 – GLOBALE: Infosphere, ZKM Karlsruhe, Germany
 2015–2016 – GLOBALE: GLOBAL CONTROL AND CENSORSHIP, ZKM Karlsruhe, Germany
 2013 – Connecting_Unfolding, MMCA - National Museum of Modern and Contemporary Art, Seoul, Korea
 2012 – Digital Art Works, The Challenges of Conservation, ZKM, Karlsruhe, Germany
 2008–2009 – YOU_ser 2.0, Celebration of the Consumer, ZKM, Karlsruhe, Germany
 2004–2008 – Loogie.net Algorithmic Revolution, ZKM Medienmuseum, Karlsruhe, Germany
 2004 – Loogie.net TV Transmediale.04 Festival „Fly Utopia!“, Berlin, Germany
 2002 – Open\\_Source\\_Art\\_Hack, New Museum, New York, USA

Presentations and workshops
 2020 – Lecture: Art from user-generated content. Social networks as a creative method, Pixels Fest, Yeltsin Center, Yekaterinburg, Russia
 2017 – Meet the Artist – Social Media Art, eine virtuelle Reise durch soziale Netzwerke, Kino Xenix, Zurich, Switzerland
 2016 – Workshop "Making Your Own Net Art", Cinnamon Colomboscope, Colombo, Sri Lanka
 2015 – Lecture, Virtual trip through social networks, Strelka, Moscow, Russia
 2010 – Test_Lab - Tools for Propaganda, V2_, Rotterdam, Netherlands

Publications
 2020 – post-futuristisch, KUNSTFORUM International Bd. 267, Magazine  
 2019 – LUX AETERNA - ISEA 2019 Art, Catalogue  
 2019 – xCoAx 2019: Proceedings of the Seventh Conference on Computation, Communication, Aesthetics and X 
 2019 – FILE SÃO PAULO 2019: 20 Years of FILE 20 Years of Art and Technology
 2019 – Research TECHNOLOGY URBANITY, Schafhof - European Center for Art Upper Bavaria
 2017 – THE UNFRAMED WORLD, Virtual Reality as Artistic Medium, Sabine Himmelsbach()
 2014 – Inauguration, National Museum of Modern and Contemporary Art, Korea 
 2010 – Was tun. Figuren des Protests. Taktiken des Widerstands
 2008 – Digital Playground 2008, "Hack the City!"
 2004 – Read_me: Software Art & Cultures, Aarhus
 2004 – MetaWorx – Young Swiss Interactive. Approaches to Interactivity
 2004 – 56kTV - bastard channel MAGAZIN

References

External links 
 Official Website
 Loogie.net

1969 births
Living people
New media artists
Net.artists
Swiss performance artists
Swiss video artists
Zurich University of the Arts alumni
Swiss contemporary artists
20th-century Swiss artists
21st-century Swiss artists